The Belgian State Railways Type 20 was a class of  steam locomotives, introduced in 1870.

Construction history
The locomotives were built by various manufacturers from 1870–1874. One additional locomotive was delivered by Cockerill in 1880.
The machines were designed by Belpaire and Stevart and had a Belpaire–Stévart valve gear.

References

Bibliography

0-8-0T locomotives
Steam locomotives of Belgium
Standard gauge locomotives of Belgium
D n2t locomotives
Railway locomotives introduced in 1870